Cleveland County School District is a public school district based in Rison, Arkansas, United States. The school district encompasses  of land, including portions of Cleveland County and Bradley County.

Within Cleveland County it serves Rison, Kingsland, Staves, and New Edinburg.

The district provides comprehensive education for more than 800 pre-kindergarten through grade 12 students while employing more than 135 teachers and staff. The district and its schools are accredited by the Arkansas Department of Education (ADE).

History 
It was established by the July 1, 2004 consolidation of the Rison School District and the Kingsland School District.

Schools 
 Rison High School, located in Rison and serving more than 350 students in grades 7 through 12.
 Rison Elementary School, located in Rison and serves students in kindergarten through grade 6.
 Head Start, located in Kingsland and serves pre-kindergarten.

References

Further reading
Maps indicating predecessor school districts:
 (Download)
 (Download)

External links 
 

School districts in Arkansas
Education in Bradley County, Arkansas
Education in Cleveland County, Arkansas
2004 establishments in Arkansas
School districts established in 2004